Indonesian National Route 5 is a road in the national route system that completely lies in the West Java province, and links the Cileunyi subdistrict, located near the city of Bandung in Bandung Regency, West Java, to the subdistrict of Palimanan, located near the city of Cirebon, in Cirebon Regency, West Java.

Route
Cileunyi - Jatinangor - North Sumedang - Jatiwangi - Palimanan

References
 http://hubdat.dephub.go.id/keputusan-dirjen/tahun-2007/561-keputusan-dirjen-no-sk-930aj/download 
http://hubdat.dephub.go.id/keputusan-dirjen/tahun-2008/562-peraturan-dirjen-sk-1207aj/download 

Indonesian National Routes
Transport in West Java